Ernie Nestor (born August 19, 1946) is an American college basketball coach, formally an assistant coach at the University of Missouri. Head coach Frank Haith named Nestor to this post in April, 2011. He was formerly the head coach of the Elon University and George Mason men's basketball teams. Nestor, a native of Philippi, West Virginia, was a long-time assistant at Wake Forest University, including an eight-year stint for head coach Dave Odom. He has also been on the coaching staffs of California, James Madison and South Carolina during his career.

Nestor began his head coaching career at John D. Bassett High School in Bassett, Virginia, where he coached from 1970 to 1976. For 14 seasons (1979–1985, 1993–2001) Nestor served as a Wake Forest assistant; Odom was the head coach during his second of two stints. The Demon Deacons won two Atlantic Coast Conference men's basketball tournament titles (1995 and 1996), and reached the final eight of the 1996 NCAA Division I men's basketball tournament in his time there. In addition, the team won the National Invitation Tournament in 2000. The U.S. 1996 William Jones Cup team was coached by Nestor.

From May 12, 1988 to March 8, 1993, Nestor was head coach at George Mason University.

In 1989, George Mason gained an NCAA Tournament berth under Nestor by winning the Colonial Athletic Association's postseason tournament; it was the first NCAA Tournament participation for the program. After losing in the first round of the NCAA tournament to Indiana, the Patriots finished the year 20–11. The 1990 team also reached the 20-victory plateau. He resigned after five years and a 68–81 record at George Mason before joining Odom on his staff at Wake Forest in 1993.

Nestor's 2008 Elon team, the seventh seed in the Southern Conference postseason tournament, made it to the finals, where Davidson defeated them. In 2009, he resigned (or was fired) after six seasons at the helm for Elon. He served as a scout for the NBA's New Jersey Nets from 2009 to 2010 before returning to the college ranks as Director of Basketball Operations for Penn State for the 2010–11 season.

After one season, Nestor left the Missouri program to take an assistant coaching position at Navy.

Head coaching record

College

References

1946 births
Living people
Alderson Broaddus Battlers men's basketball players
American men's basketball coaches
Basketball coaches from West Virginia
Basketball players from West Virginia
California Golden Bears men's basketball coaches
College men's basketball head coaches in the United States
Elon Phoenix men's basketball coaches
George Mason Patriots men's basketball coaches
High school basketball coaches in the United States
James Madison Dukes men's basketball coaches
Missouri Tigers men's basketball coaches
People from Philippi, West Virginia
South Carolina Gamecocks men's basketball coaches
Wake Forest Demon Deacons men's basketball coaches
American men's basketball players